The 2016 Washburn Ichabods football team represented Washburn University in the 2016 NCAA Division II football season. The Ichabods played their home games on Foster Field in Yager Stadium at Moore Bowl in Topeka, Kansas, as they have done since 1928. 2016 was the 126th season in school history. The Ichabods were led by fifteenth-year head coach, Craig Schurig. Washburn has been a member of the Mid-America Intercollegiate Athletics Association since 1989.

Preseason
The Ichabods entered the 2016 season after finishing with a 5–6 record overall and in conference play, under Schurig. On August 2, 2016 at the MIAA Football Media Day, the Ichabods were chosen to finish in 8th place in both the Coaches Poll and in the Media Poll.

Personnel

Coaching staff
Along with Schurig, there were 11 assistants.

Roster

Schedule

Source:

Game notes, regular season

Northeastern State

Northwest Missouri State

Lindenwood

Nebraska–Kearney

Pittsburg State

Missouri Southern

Fort Hays State

Central Missouri

Missouri Western

Central Oklahoma

Emporia State

Game notes, post-season

Minnesota–Duluth

References

Washburn
Washburn Ichabods football seasons
Washburn Ichabods football